Mousa Sulaiman Al-Tamari (born 10 June 1997) is a Jordanian professional footballer who plays as a winger for Belgian side OH Leuven and the Jordan national team.

Club career

Shabab Al-Ordon
He started his career in Shabab Al-Ordon, he was notoriously rapid, had great skills and amazing footwork, he got called up by the senior national team after his first 6 matches, he achieved the 2016 Jordan FA Shield.

Al-Jazeera (loan)
In September 2017, he was loaned to Al-Jazeera, He participated in the AFC Cup 2018 and scored many important goals for his team, he achieved the 2017–18 Jordan FA Cup.

APOEL
On 28 May 2018, Al-Tamari signed a three–year contract for a fee of €400 thousand with Cypriot club APOEL. He won the 2019 Cypriot Super Cup title, 2018–19 Cypriot First Division title and became known as one of the best players in Cyprus. He also ended up winning the MVP (Most Valuable Player) of the Cypriot League.

OH Leuven
On 5 October 2020, Al-Tamari joined Belgian First Division A club OH Leuven on a three–year contract, for a reported transfer fee of €1.1 million.

International career
Al-Taamari's first international match was a friendly against Lebanon on 31 August 2016, which ended in a 1–1 draw. Al-Tamari was only 19 years old at the time. He went on to make six more international appearances during 2016. In 2017, he scored his first goal for Jordan in a friendly match against Hong Kong. Al-Tamari was named in Jordan's squad for the 2019 AFC Asian Cup, he played three matches, scored one goal and made two assists at the tournament.

Style of play
Being a left-footed right winger, Al-Tamari has a general tendency to cut inside and take on players with his fantastic dribbling ability. His ability to keep the ball close to his feet even in tight spaces is what makes him very dangerous when attacking defences. Al-Tamari's pace, trickery and general style of play have seen him compared to Liverpool winger Mohamed Salah.

Career statistics

Club

International

International goals
Scores and results list Jordan's goal tally first.

Honours

Shabab Al-Ordon
 Jordan FA Shield: 2016

Al-Jazeera
 Jordan FA Cup: 2017–18

APOEL
 Cypriot First Division: 2018–19
 Cypriot Super Cup: 2019

Individual
Cypriot First Division MVP: 2018–19

References

External links 
 
 
 
 Musa Al-Taamari at APOEL

1997 births
Living people
Sportspeople from Amman
Jordanian people of Palestinian descent
Jordanian footballers
Association football wingers
Shabab Al-Ordon Club players
Al-Jazeera (Jordan) players
APOEL FC players
Al-Tamaari
Jordanian Pro League players
Cypriot First Division players
Al-Tamaari
Jordanian expatriate footballers
Expatriate footballers in Cyprus
Al-Tamaari
Jordanian expatriate sportspeople in Cyprus
Al-Tamaari
Jordan international footballers
2019 AFC Asian Cup players